Zuojhen District is a rural district of about 4,410 residents in Tainan, Taiwan.

History

After the handover of Taiwan from Japan to the Republic of China in 1945, Zuojhen was organized as a rural township of Tainan County. On 25 December 2010, Tainan County was merged with Tainan City and Zuojhen was upgraded to a district of the city.

Administrative divisions 

The district consists of Guanghe, Ronghe, Zuozhen, Zhongzheng, Muguang, Neizhuang, Dengshan, Ganglin, Caoshan and Erliao Village.

Tourist attractions 
 Tainan City Zuojhen Fossil Park
 Ancient Woods of Hengshan Ancestors
 Cailiao Fossil Museum
 Caoshan Moon World
 Luo Lai-Shou Museum
 Museum of Natural History
 Oyster Glass Window
 Yanshuei Keng Bubbling Mud

References 

Districts of Tainan